Lewis County is a county in the U.S. state of Washington. As of the 2020 census, the county's population was 82,149. The county seat is Chehalis, and its largest city is Centralia. Lewis County comprises the Centralia, WA Micropolitan Statistical Area, which is also included in the Seattle-Tacoma, WA Combined Statistical Area.

History
The county was created as Vancouver County on December 19, 1845, by the Provisional Government of Oregon, named for George Vancouver. In 1849, the county name was changed, to honor Meriwether Lewis. At the time, the county included all U.S. lands north of the Cowlitz River, including much of the Puget Sound region and British Columbia. 

The county received official recognition as a "Purple Heart County" in November 2019.

Geography and natural features

Geographic features
Cascade Mountains
Chehalis River
Cowlitz River
Nisqually River
Lake Mayfield
Riffe Lake
Big Horn, the highest point in Lewis county
Boistfort Peak, the highest point in the Willapa Hills
Walupt Creek Falls

Major highways
 Interstate 5
 U.S. Route 12
 State Route 6
 State Route 7

Adjacent counties

Grays Harbor County – north/northwest
Thurston County – north
Pierce County – north/northeast
Yakima County – east
Skamania County – south/southeast
Cowlitz County – south
Wahkiakum County – south/southwest
Pacific County – west

National protected areas
 Gifford Pinchot National Forest (part)
 Mount Baker-Snoqualmie National Forest (part)
 Mount Rainier National Park (part)
 Mount St. Helens National Volcanic Monument (part)

Demographics

2010 census
As of the 2010 Census, there were 75,455 people, 29,743 households, and 20,104 families residing in the county. The racial makeup of the county's population: 89.7% white, 1.4% American Indian, 0.9% Asian, 0.5% black or African American, 0.2% Pacific islander, 4.0% from other races, and 3.2% from two or more races. Those of Hispanic or Latino origin made up 8.7% of the population. In terms of ancestry, 24.1% were German, 14.9% were Irish, 12.5% were English, 7.7% were American, and 5.1% were Norwegian.

Of the 29,743 households, 30.2% had children under the age of 18 living with them, 51.2% were married couples living together, 10.9% had a female householder with no husband present, 32.4% were non-families, and 25.7% of all households were made up of individuals. The average household size was 2.51 and the average family size was 2.97. The median age was 41.5 years.

The median income for a household in the county was $43,874 and the median income for a family was $53,358. Males had a median income of $43,695 versus $31,720 for females. The per capita income for the county was $21,695. About 10.3% of families and 13.3% of the population were below the poverty line, including 18.2% of those under age 18 and 8.6% of those age 65 or over.

2000 census
As of the 2000 Census, there were 68,600 people, 26,306 households, and 18,572 families in the county. The population density was 28 people per square mile (11/km2). There were 29,585 housing units at an average density of 12 per square mile (5/km2). The racial makeup of the county was 92.96% White, 0.38% Black or African American, 1.22% Native American, 0.69% Asian, 0.18% Pacific Islander, 2.55% from other races, and 2.01% from two or more races. 5.37% of the population were Hispanic or Latino of any race. 18.7% were of German, 11.8% United States or American, 11.1% English, 8.7% Irish and 5.7% Norwegian ancestry.

There were 26,306 households, 31.60% of which had resident children under age 18, 55.90% were married couples living together, 9.90% had a female householder with no husband present, and 29.40% were non-families. 24.00% of households were made up of individuals, and 11.20% had someone living alone who was 65 years of age or older. The average household size was 2.57 and the average family size was 3.02.

The age distribution of the county's population: 26.50% under age 18, 8.20% from 18 to 24, 25.20% from 25 to 44, 24.50% from 45 to 64, and 15.50% at or over age 65. The median age was 38 years. For every 100 females there were 98.30 males. For every 100 females age 18 and over, there were 95.40 males.

The median income for a household in the county was $35,511, and the median income for a family was $41,105. Males had a median income of $35,714 versus $23,453 for females. The per capita income for the county was $17,082.  About 10.40% of families and 14.00% of the population were below the poverty line, including 18.60% of those under age 18 and 9.40% of those age 65 or over.

Government and politics

National level
In modern times, Lewis County is the most conservative county in western Washington. It is significantly more Republican than adjacent counties. Unlike much of western Washington, it has a strong tinge of social conservatism. In 2000, George W. Bush received over 60% of the county's vote. In 2008 John McCain defeated Barack Obama by over eighteen percent — his only victory in a county west of the Cascades. McCain lost all the neighboring counties except Yakima. Since Washington's statehood in 1889 only three Democratic presidential candidates have carried the county – William Jennings Bryan in 1896, Franklin D. Roosevelt three times in 1932, 1936 and 1940, plus Lyndon B. Johnson in 1964. 

It is part of Washington's 3rd congressional district, which has been represented by Democrat Marie Gluesenkamp Perez since 2023.

Gubernatorial races
In the 1970s, Democratic candidates for governor won the county, but this was something of an anomaly. The last Democratic candidate for Governor to win the county was Booth Gardner in 1984.

State representation
The county's government is the 20th district of the state. It is represented solely by Republicans.

Senator John Braun—Republican
Representative Peter Abbarno—Position 1, Republican
Representative Ed Orcutt—Position 2, Republican

County level
The county's government is solely Republican.

Lewis County Assessor: Dianne Dorey—R
Lewis County Auditor: Larry E. Grove—R
Lewis County Clerk: Scott Tinney—R
Coroner Warren Mcleod—R
Lewis County Prosecuting Attorney: Jonathan Meyer—R
Lewis County Sheriff: Rob Snaza—R
Lewis County Treasurer: Arny Davis—R
Sean D. Swope, District #1—R
Dr. Lindsey Pollock, District #2—R
(vacant) Previous incumbent Gary Stamper -- R died from COVID-19.

Communities

Cities

Centralia
Chehalis (county seat)
Morton
Mossyrock
Napavine
Toledo
Vader
Winlock

Town
Pe Ell

Census-designated places
Fords Prairie
Mineral
Onalaska
Packwood

Unincorporated communities

Adna
Alpha
Boistfort
Bunker
Ceres
Cinebar
Curtis
Doty
Dryad
Ethel
Evaline
Galvin
Glenoma
Harmony
Klaber
Kosmos (former - now under Riffe Lake)
Lacamas
Littell
Mary's Corner
Nesika (former, now inundated by S edge of Riffe Lake)
Newaukum
Randle
Riffe (former, now inundated by Riffe Lake)
Ruth
Saint Urban
Salkum
Silver Creek
Wildwood

See also
National Register of Historic Places listings in Lewis County, Washington

References

Further reading
Available online through the Washington State Library's Classics in Washington History collection Daily diary for the entire year of 1865, recording the details of pioneer life in Washington Territory from the perspective of a 12-year-old girl who was part of a prominent Lewis County family. Brief entries document the activities of running the farm and the number of visitors and immigrants that stopped at the Jackson home.
Early history of Lewis County on Drizzle.com

External links
Lewis County Official Website

 
1845 establishments in Oregon Country
Populated places established in 1845
Western Washington